Bruno Miguel Ponces Lourenço (born 2 February 1998) is a Portuguese professional footballer who plays for Boavista F.C. as a midfielder.

Club career

Aves
Lourenço was born in Lisbon. He played youth football with S.L. Benfica, from ages 10 to 19.

In the summer of 2017, Lourenço signed with Primeira Liga club C.D. Aves, being immediately loaned to lowly C.D.C. Montalegre. After his return to the former he made his league debut on 18 May 2019, coming on as a second-half substitute in a 2–1 away loss against C.D. Feirense.

Lourenço was mainly associated to the under-23 team during his spell at the Estádio do CD Aves.

Estoril
On 27 July 2020, Lourenço joined G.D. Estoril Praia of the Liga Portugal 2 on a three-year contract. He scored three goals in 23 matches in his first season, in a return to the top division as champions.

Lourenço scored his first goal in the Portuguese top tier on 23 August 2021, equalising an eventual 3–1 away win over F.C. Paços de Ferreira in injury time of the first half.

Boavista
On 14 June 2022, Lourenço agreed to a three-year deal at Boavista FC. He scored his first goals on 17 September, both of a 2–1 home defeat of Sporting CP including the decider from the penalty spot.

International career
Lourenço earned 31 caps for Portugal at youth level. On 24 September 2014, he scored the only goal for the under-17 team as they defeated Turkey in qualification for the 2015 UEFA European Championship.

Honours
Estoril
Liga Portugal 2: 2020–21

References

External links

1998 births
Living people
Portuguese footballers
Footballers from Lisbon
Association football midfielders
Primeira Liga players
Liga Portugal 2 players
Campeonato de Portugal (league) players
S.L. Benfica footballers
C.D. Aves players
C.D.C. Montalegre players
G.D. Estoril Praia players
Boavista F.C. players
Portugal youth international footballers